Literary modernism has its origins in the late 19th and early 20th centuries, mainly in Europe and North America. Modernism is characterized by a self-conscious break with traditional styles of poetry and verse. Modernists experimented with literary form and expression, adhering to Ezra Pound's maxim to "Make it new". The modernist literary movement was driven by a conscious desire to overturn traditional modes of representation and express the new sensibilities of their time. 
It is debatable when the modernist literary movement began, though some have chosen 1910 as roughly marking the beginning and quote novelist Virginia Woolf, who declared that human nature underwent a fundamental change "on or about December 1910." But modernism was already stirring by 1899, with works such as Joseph Conrad's (1857–1924) Heart of Darkness, while Alfred Jarry's (1873–1907) absurdist play, Ubu Roi appeared even earlier, in 1896. Knut Hamsun's (1859–1952) Hunger (1890) is a groundbreaking modernist novel and Mysteries (1892) pioneers modernist stream of consciousness method.

When modernism ends is debatable. Though The Oxford Encyclopedia of British Literature sees Modernism ending by c.1939, with regard to British and American literature, "When (if) Modernism petered out and postmodernism began has been contested almost as hotly as when the transition from Victorianism to Modernism occurred". Clement Greenberg sees Modernism ending in the 1930s, with the exception of the visual and performing arts.  In fact many literary modernists lived into the 1950s and 1960s, though generally speaking they were no longer producing major works. The term late modernism is also sometimes applied to modernist works published after 1930. Among modernists (or late modernists) still publishing after 1945 were Wallace Stevens, Gottfried Benn, T. S. Eliot, Anna Akhmatova, William Faulkner, Dorothy Richardson, John Cowper Powys, and Ezra Pound. Basil Bunting, born in 1901, published his most important modernist poem Briggflatts in 1965. In addition Hermann Broch's The Death of Virgil was published in 1945 and Thomas Mann's Doctor Faustus in 1947. Samuel Beckett, who died in 1989, has been described as a "later modernist". Beckett is a writer with roots in the expressionist tradition of modernism, who produced works from the 1930s until the 1980s, including Molloy (1951), En attendant Godot (1953), Happy Days (1961), Rockaby (1981).  The poets Charles Olson (1910-1970) and J. H. Prynne (1936- ) are, amongst other writing in the second half of the 20th century, who have been described as late modernists.

The following is a list of significant modernist writers:

References

See also
List of modernist women writers
List of modernist poets
Modernist literature
English literature
American literature
European literature
French literature
German literature

Modernism
Lists of writers
Lists of poets
Lists of novelists by genre
Lists of dramatists and playwrights